The Last Night is a 1936 Soviet drama film directed by Yuli Raizman.

Plot 
The film takes place on the last night of the Russian Empire. The film intertwines the fate of the family of the capitalist Leontyev and the worker Zakharkin, whose children are involved in organizing the worker's uprising.

Starring 
 Ivan Pelttser as Yegor Zakharkin
 Mariya Yarotskaya as Zakharkin's Wife
 Nikolai Dorokhin as Pyotr Zakharkin
 Aleksey Konsovsky as Kuzma Zakharkin
 Vladimir Popov as Ilya Zakharkin
 Nikolai Rybnikov as Pyotr Leontyev
 Sergei Vecheslov as Aleksei Leontyev
 Tatiana Okunevskaya as Lena Leontyeva
 Leonid Knyazev as Shura Leontyev
 Mikhail Kholodov as Officer Soskin
 Vladimir Gribkov as Mikhailov
 Ivan Arkadin as Semikhatov
 Osip Abdulov as Colonel
 Vladimir Dorofeyev as Stationmaster (uncredited)

References

External links 

1936 films
1930s Russian-language films
Soviet drama films
1936 drama films
Soviet black-and-white films